The 1996 Pittwater state by-election was held on 25 May 1996 for the New South Wales Legislative Assembly electorate of Pittwater following the retirement of sitting member, Jim Longley.

On the same day, by-elections were held in the seats of Clarence, Orange, Southern Highlands and Strathfield.

All seats were retained by the Liberal-National parties, with the exception of Clarence. In Pittwater, the Liberal Party retained the seat despite a swing of 5.81% against them on a two-party preferred basis.

Results

Jim Longley resigned.

See also
Electoral results for the district of Pittwater
List of New South Wales state by-elections

References

1996 elections in Australia
New South Wales state by-elections
1990s in New South Wales